The Hastings trolleybus system once served the town of Hastings, East Sussex, England. Tram replacement cost £1,383 per mile, but increased average speed from 7.5 to over 10 mph and cut costs from 13d to 10d per mile.

By the standards of the various now-defunct trolleybus systems in the United Kingdom, the Hastings system was a moderately sized one, with a total of 10 routes, and a maximum fleet of 58 trolleybuses. However, by May 1929 Hastings had 21 miles of trolleybus routes, then the longest in the world.

Maidstone & District Motor Services bought the Tramway Co. in November 1935, but didn't merge it until 1957. The livery changed from brown to green after the takeover, but the 'Hastings Tramways' logo remained until 1957. The power source also changed in 1936, when the tramway power station at Ore was replaced by municipal power.

Four of the former Hastings trolleybuses are now preserved.  One is at the Trolleybus Museum at Sandtoft, Lincolnshire, and another at East Anglia Transport Museum, Carlton Colville, Suffolk.  The remaining two, one of which was fitted with a diesel engine in 1959–60, are owned by the Hastings Trolleybus Restoration Group, Bexhill-on-Sea, East Sussex. The earliest is 1929 open top No.3, which was stored in 1938, but restored in 1952 to run summer open top services.

See also

Transport in Hastings
List of trolleybus systems in the United Kingdom

Notes

References

Bibliography

External links

Hastings Trolleybus Restoration Group
SCT'61 website - photos and descriptions of Hastings and District trolleybuses
Historical Hastings Wiki - Trolleybuses
National Trolleybus Archive
British Trolleybus Society, based in Reading
National Trolleybus Association, based in London

Transport in Hastings
Hastings
Hastings
History of East Sussex
1928 establishments in England
1959 disestablishments in England